|}

The Tara Hurdle was a Grade 2 National Hunt hurdle race in Ireland until 2013, when it was downgraded to a Grade B handicap. It is run at Navan Racecourse in December, over a distance of 2 miles and 4 furlongs. The race was first run in 1999.

Records
Most successful horse (3 wins):
 Limestone Lad – 1999, 2001, 2002
 Solerina – 2003, 2004, 2005

Leading jockey (3 wins):
 Paul Carberry – Limestone Lad (2001, 2002), Jazz Messenger (2007)
 
Leading trainer (6 wins):
 James Bowe – Limestone Lad (1999, 2001, 2002), Solerina (2003, 2004, 2005)

Winners since 1999

See also
 Horse racing in Ireland
 List of Irish National Hunt races

References
 Racing Post:
 , 

National Hunt races in Ireland
National Hunt hurdle races
Navan Racecourse
Recurring sporting events established in 1999
1999 establishments in Ireland